The 2018–19 Louisville Cardinals men's basketball team represented the University of Louisville during the 2018–19 NCAA Division I men's basketball season. The team played its home games on Denny Crum Court at the KFC Yum! Center in downtown Louisville, Kentucky as members of the Atlantic Coast Conference. They were led by first-year head coach Chris Mack who was hired on March 27, 2018 after it was announced interim coach David Padgett would not be retained. They finished the season 20-14, to finish in 7th place. In the ACC Tournament, they beat Notre Dame in the Second Round before losing to North Carolina in the Quarterfinals. They received a at-large bid to the NCAA Tournament and received a 7th seed before losing to 10th seed Minnesota in the First Round.

Previous season
The Cardinals finished the 2017–18 season with a record of 22–14, 9–9 in ACC play, finishing in a tie for 8th with Florida State, who they defeated in the second round of the ACC tournament before losing to Virginia in the quarterfinals. They received an invitation to the NIT, where they defeated Northern Kentucky in the first round and Middle Tennessee in the second round before being defeated in the quarterfinals by Mississippi State.

Offseason

Departures

Incoming transfers

2018 recruiting class
No recruits.

Roster

Schedule and results

|-
!colspan=12 style=| Exhibition

|-
!colspan=12 style=| Non-conference regular season

|-
!colspan=12 style=| ACC Regular Season

|-
!colspan=12 style=| ACC Tournament

|-
!colspan=12 style=| NCAA tournament

Source:

Rankings

*AP does not release post-NCAA Tournament rankings

References

Louisville
Louisville Cardinals men's basketball seasons
Louisville Cardinals men's basketball, 2018-19
Louisville Cardinals men's basketball, 2018-19
Louisville